Dmitriyeva Polyana is a rural locality (a village) and the administrative centre of Dmitriyevo-Polyansky Selsoviet, Sharansky District, Bashkortostan, Russia. The population was 545 as of 2010. There are 10 streets.

Geography 
Dmitriyeva Polyana is located 8 km northwest of Sharan (the district's administrative centre) by road. Preobrazhenskoye is the nearest rural locality.

References 

Rural localities in Sharansky District